DWLD (88.7 FM), broadcasting as 88.7 DCG FM, is a radio station owned and operated by DCG Radio-TV Network. The station's studio is located in Batangas City, and its transmitter is located at Mt. Banoy, Talumpok Silangan, Batangas City.

History
The station was established in October 2010 as Majic 88.7. At that time, it was operated by BPS Broadcasting Media Services, with studios located at the 3rd Floor, Zen's Building, Ayala Highway, Brgy. Balintawak, Lipa, Batangas. In September 2020, DCG took over the station's operations. It rebranded as 88.7 DCG FM and switched to an all-OPM format.

References

Radio stations in Batangas
Radio stations established in 2010